Concepción is a municipality in the Honduran department of Copán. The main town contains the church Iglesia Católica de Concepción Copán.

References

Municipalities of the Copán Department